Justin James may refer to:

Music
Justin James (musician), American singer-songwriter
Justin James (music producer), Canadian electronic musician, DJ, and producer
Justin James (music director), Indian composer, singer and guitarist in Malayalam cinema

Sports
Justin James (baseball), former professional baseball player
Justin James (basketball), American basketball player 
Justin James (golfer) (born 1990), American golfer

See also
James Justin, English professional footballer